The Burnie Ten is an Australian 10 km road race held on a Sunday in October every year in Burnie in  North West Tasmania along Emu Bay.

Route
The race starts north of Wilson/Cattley Street intersection and proceeds south along Wilson Street to the Bass Highway. It follows the highway east, past the Burnie Yacht Club and Wivenhoe to the five kilometer turning point, then returns along the same route to the start-finish line.

In 2015, a 5km event was added with 489 participating in the five kilometre event with the half way point near the Emu River.

In 2020, in response to the COVID-19 pandemic the event was held virtually, with entrants able to complete the race in their own time on either 17 or 18 October.

Selected results 

All information from The ‘Burnie Ten Honour Board’

References

Athletics in Tasmania
Sport in Burnie, Tasmania
10K runs
Running in Australia